This article lists the presidents of the Corts Valencianes, the regional legislature of the Valencian Community.

Presidents

References

Valencia